Peter Månsson is a Swedish music producer and songwriter, who often writes his name as Peter Mansson when working with non-Swedish artists. He is based in MIR Studios, Stockholm, Sweden.

Discography

Production, Mixing and/or Songwriting
 "Want You Back" (Mandy Moore)
 "Make It Happen" (Blue)
 "Come" (Namie Amuro)
 "Only You" (Namie Amuro)
 "Next Flight" (Passpo)
 "Straight Up (No Bends)" (Brian Harvey)
My Love Is For Real (Victoria Beckham) (Prev. Not Released)
 "Stop Waiting (Start Living)" (Neverstore)
 "All Star Loser" (Neverstore)
 "So Much Of Not Enough" (Neverstore)
 "Stay Forever" (Neverstore)
 "Nanana" (Neverstore)
 "Another Senimental Argument" (Neverstore)
 "L.Y.D." (Neverstore)
 "Racer" (Neverstore)
 "On Your Side" (Neverstore)
 "Golden Youth" (Neverstore)
 "Golden Youth" (Neverstore)
 "Last Goodbye" (Neverstore)
 "Rock The Fool" (Neverstore)
 "Rejected All Along" (Neverstore)
 "History" (Neverstore)
 "Hold On" (Neverstore)
 "Out Of Breath" (Neverstore)
 "Run And Hide" (Neverstore)
 "Waiting" (Neverstore)
 "My Greatest Enemy" (Neverstore)
 "And There She Goes" (Neverstore)
 "Count Me Out" (Neverstore)
 "King Of The World" (Neverstore)
 "Over And Out" (Neverstore)
 "Thank You" (Neverstore)
 "Åh vilken härlig dag" (Magnus Uggla)
 "Tvättbräda" (Magnus Uggla)
 "Fredagskväll på Hallen" (Magnus Uggla)
 "Pärlor åt svin" (Magnus Uggla)
 "Vild och skild" (Magnus Uggla)
 "Borta bra men hemma bäst" (Magnus Uggla)
 "Det är vårt liv" (Magnus Uggla)
 "Coverbandens förlovade land" (Magnus Uggla)
 "Min igen" (Magnus Uggla)
 "Du och jag mot hela världen" (Magnus Uggla)
 "24 Timmar" (Magnus Uggla)
All The Way (Markus Fagervall)
How Come You’re The One (Markus Fagervall)
Close My Eyes (Markus Fagervall)
Something Real (Markus Fagervall)
For Once (Markus Fagervall)
Indian Sky (Markus Fagervall)
Heartstopper (Markus Fagervall)
The Best Of What I Got (Markus Fagervall)
Hole In The Sky (Markus Fagervall)
Only You (Markus Fagervall)
 "Insanity" (Darin)
 "Desire" (Darin)
Saturday Night (add Prod & Mix) (Darin)
Play This Game With Me (Krezip)
Life Is Sweet (Krezip)
Plug It In & Turn Me On (Krezip)
Ordinary Day (Krezip)
Can’t Be Mine (Krezip)
Easy Way Out (Krezip)
Not Tonight (Krezip)
Bored (Krezip)
You’re Wrong (Krezip)
Hey There Love (Krezip)
All My Life (Krezip)
Falling Apart (Krezip)
Get Me (Krezip)
This Is Our Night (Gio)
 "Une étincelle" (L5)
Heartbreak Lullaby (A*Teens)
Slammin’ Kinda Love (A*Teens)
I Wish It Could Be Christmas Every Day (A*Teens)
San Toi (Judith Berard)
Heartbeat (Tymes 4)
Take Me Alive (Dons)
American Lovebite (Dons)
When Love Turns To Pain (Dons)
Mr Green (Dons)
Just Save Me (Dons)
Berlin Berlin (Happy Gigolos)
Tjenare Kungen (Tjenare Kungen)
Do You Like To Watch (Lola Ponce)
(Theme From) Lucy Street (Lucy Street)
Don’t Stop The Music (Lucy Street)
Come My Way (Sophie Monk)
Shame (Anna Abreu)
Bad Girl (Anna Abreu)
(Too Late) To Save It With A Lovesong (Patric Nuo)
Remedy (Charlotte Perrelli)
 "Under mitt tunna skinn" (Patrik Isaksson)
 "Du som tog mitt hjärta" (Patrik Isaksson & Sarah Dawn Finer)
Right Place, Right Time (B3)
Right Thing To Do (Sandy & Junior)
Vidare (Adolphson & Falk)
Hav (Adolphson & Falk)
Blinkar Blå (Adolphson & Falk)
Soloviolin (Adolphson & Falk)
Krafter Vi Aldrig Känner (Adolphson & Falk)
I Nattens Lugn (Adolphson & Falk)
Ifrån (Adolphson & Falk)
Låter Det Ske (Adolphson & Falk)
5:e Avenyn (Adolphson & Falk)
Sthlms Serenad (Adolphson & Falk)
Ljuset PÅ Min Väg (Adolphson & Falk)
Tyngdlös (Adolphson & Falk)
Hals Över Huvud (Lena & Orup)
Nu När Du Gått (Lena & Orup)
Fotbollsstjärna (Lena & Orup)
Jag Hatar Att Vakna Utan DIg (Lena & Orup)
1 Skäl (Lena & Orup)
Fem Minuter I Himmelen (Lena & Orup)
Bara En Polis (Lena & Orup)
Så Mycket Bättre Än Dom Andra (Lena & Orup)
Blott En Skugga (Lena & Orup)
Nu När Du Gått (Cinderella Version) (Lena & Orup)
Fotbollsstjärna (Gary Sundgren Version) (Lena & Orup)
Paradise (Monotypes)
Celebration (Monotypes)
Real Love (Cries For More) (Monotypes)
Dead Streets (Monotypes) (Greys Anatomy)
Hurricane (Monotypes)
Intro (Monotypes)
Prez Rixon (Monotypes)
Volga (Monotypes)
All That You Need (Monotypes)
The Shore (Monotypes)
Lose It All Tonight (Monotypes)
Lea (Monotypes)
One Minute (Monotypes)
Teenage Battlefield (Johan Palm)
Emma-Lee (Johan Palm)
Come On (Johan Palm)
All The Time In The World (Johan Palm)
Danger Danger (Johan Palm)
Antidote (Johan Palm)
Satellite (Johan Palm)
You're Killing Me (Johan Palm)
More To Her Than Meets The Eye (Johan Palm)
Let The Dream Begin (Johan Palm)
A Hundred Different Ways (Kevin Borg)
Tonight (Johannes)
Between A Rock And A Hard Place (Album 12 Songs) (Erik Grönwall)
 A New Day Sun (Album 11 Songs) (Treadstone)
"Stubborn" (Bonnie Tyler)

Mix Only
 "The War Is Over" (Treat)
 "All In" (Treat)
 "Paper Tiger" (Treat)
 "Roar" (Treat)
 "Tangled Up" (Treat)
 "Heaven Can Wait" (Treat)
 "I’m Not Runnin’" (Treat)
 "Breathless" (Treat)
 "Famous" (Play)
Girls (Play)
Trash (Play)
Punkdrömmar
Suzanne (Vi Kan Inte Gå Hand I Hand)

References 

Swedish songwriters
1974 births
Living people